Penal Code (형법) is the criminal law code currently used in South Korea. The first modern form of criminal code in Korea was introduced during Korea under Japanese rule. From 1912 to 1953, the Japanese Criminal code was used for the duration of around 40 years. In Sept 18, 1953, South Korea enacted its own criminal code.

Origin 
The criminal related laws for Joseon generally followed China's forms of law; however it had its own uniqueness based on Joseon traditions and Neo-Confucianist ideologies. In 1912, the Governor-General of Korea declared the Chosun Criminal Order (조선형사령) and in April 4 of the same year, the Penal Code of Japan and Criminal justice system of Japan was in force in Korea. After liberation, the Chosun Criminal Order was still in place until Oct 2, 1953 by the USAMGIK Ordinance 21 and the Constitution of South Korea.

The law was enacted 50 days after the Korean War on September 18, 1953. 15 days later in Oct.3, the law was officially in force.

The Penal Code enacted in 1953 was mostly a translation of the former Japanese criminal code. However, as time passed, South Korea's Penal Code became more subjective than the Japanese criminal code. The South Korean Penal Code has stronger penalties in comparison to the Japanese criminal code, excluding robbery and other property related crimes. Punishments are stricter on laws regarding government rights and almost all laws that include punishments for preparing a criminal act also have a punishment for plotting one.

Abstract

Types of Punishment 
Types of punishment include under the criminal code Capital punishment, Imprisonment with hard labor, Imprisonment, disqualification, Loss of rights due to conviction for criminal offense, Fine (penalty), minor fine, and Confiscation of property.

Imprisonment with hard labor and imprisonment is classified as an Indefinite imprisonment and Definite imprisonment. Definite imprisonments are longer than a period of 1 month and less than 30 years. However, in the case of an additional punishment, definite sentences can last up to 50 years.

Parts 

Penal code of Korea is composed with two parts, a general regulation and each crime.
In general regulations, there are four parts, 1. Application scope of Criminal law, 2. Crime, 3. Punishment, 4. Duration.
In the part of each crime, it defines 42 crimes.

Crimes in Penal Code of Korea
 conspiracy of a rebellion
 conspiracy of the foreign troubles
 crime about the national flag
 crime about diplomatic relations
 infringement of public peace
 crime about explosive materials
 crime about a duty of Public Officials
 interference with a government official in the exercise on his duty
 a fugitive and a concealment of the criminal
 the perjury and the destruction of evidence
 the calumny (the false charge)
 spoil a dead body and a burial ground
 the incendiarism and an accidental fire
 crime about irrigation and water control
 infringement of the traffic
 crime about drinking water (poisoning into water)
 crime about illegal drugs
 crime about currency (a counterfeit)
 crime about a check, a bond, a stock (forgery)
 forgery of a document (public and private)
 the forgery of a seal
 crime about adultery
Penal code of Korea still have the provisions of adultery.
It is now controversial whether it is not against the constitutional law
 crime about a lottery ticket
 murder
Penal code of Korea, There is an increasing punishment of murder of parents.
It may be effected by Confucianism.
 the injury and the violence
 an accidental homicide and injury
 the abortion
 abandon and maltreatment to person
 illegal imprisonment and confinement
 the duress
 the abduction (kidnapping)
 the rape and committing obscene acts
 the defamation of character (slander)
 the spread of falsehood
 the leakage of classified information
 unlawful entry
 the interruption of other persons' legal rights
 the theft and the burglary
 the fraud and the menace
 the breach of trust and the embezzlement
 crime of dealing in stolen goods
 destruction of other's property

References

External links

See also 

 Civil Code of Republic of Korea
 Constitution of South Korea

Politics of South Korea
Crime in South Korea
Criminal codes